The following is a timeline of the history of the city of Perugia in the Umbria region of Italy.

Prior to 17th century

 310 BCE - Romans in power; settlement named "Perusia."
 3rd century BCE - Etruscan  built.
 216 and 205 BCE - Assisted Rome in the Hannibalic war.
 90 BCE - Town "received Roman citizenship."
 40 BCE - Perusia sacked during the Perusine War.
 5th century CE - Roman Catholic diocese of Perugia established.
 548 CE - Perugia besieged by forces of Ostrogoth Totila during the Gothic War (535–554).
 10th century - Benedictine San Pietro abbey founded.
 1139 - Perugia "recorded as a free comune."
 1205 -  (church) rebuilt.
 1216 - Papal election, 1216 held at Perugia.
 1250 -  (church) built (approximate date).
 1264 - Papal election, 1264–65 held at Perugia.
 1278 - Fontana Maggiore (fountain) erected in the Piazza Maggiore.
 1285 - Papal election, 1285 held at Perugia.
 1293 - Palazzo del Popolo construction begins.
 1294 - Papal election, 1292–94 held at Perugia.
 1304
 Papal conclave, 1304–05 held at Perugia.
 San Domenico church construction begins.
 1308 - University of Perugia established.
 1345 - Perugia Cathedral construction begins.
 1348 - Plague.
 1390 -  (merchants' guild office) built in the Palazzo dei Priori.
 1416 - Braccio da Montone in power.
 1424 - Baglioni (family) in power.
 1453 - Università Vecchia built on the Piazza del Sopramuro.
 1457 - Collegio del Cambio (exchange guild office) built in the Palazzo dei Priori.
 1461 -  facade constructed.
 1475 - Printing press in operation.
 1480 -  (gate) built.
 1490 - Perugia Cathedral completed.
 1534 - Perugia "deprived of its privileges."
 1540
 Salt War (1540).
  (gate) dismantled.
 1543 - Rocca Paolina (fort) built.
 1548 -  built.
 1561 -  founded.
 1573
 Accademia del Disegno founded.
 Vincenzo Danti appointed city architect.
 1587 - Perugia Cathedral consecrated.

17th-19th centuries
 1623 - Biblioteca Augusta (library) opens.
 1665 -  (church) built.
 1720 - Orto Botanico dell'Università di Perugia (garden) established.
 1723 -  (theatre) opens.
 1758 -  built.
 1762 - Montemorcino monastery built.
 1781 - Teatro Morlacchi (theatre) opens.
 1797 - Perugia was occupied by the French.
 1798 - Perugia becomes part of the  department of France.
 1832 - Earthquake.(it)
 1838 - Earthquake.(it)
 1840 - Ancient Hypogeum of the Volumnus family rediscovered near Perugia.
 1849
 Austrians in power.
  (cemetery) established.
 1854 - Earthquake.
 1859 - 20 June: 1859 Perugia uprising.
 1860
 Perugia becomes part of the Kingdom of Italy.
  in business.
 1863 - Pinacoteca Vannucci (museum) established.
 1866 - Perugia railway station opens.
 1891 -  (theatre) opens.
 1899 - Tram begins operating.

20th century

 1905 - A.C. Perugia (football club) formed.
 1911 - Population: 65,805.
 1943 -  begins operating.
 1944 - 20 June: Allied forces enter city.
 1961 -  begins.
 1974 -  (history society) formed.
 1975 - Stadio Renato Curi (stadium) opens.
 1983 - Corriere dell'Umbria newspaper begins publication.
 1984 - 29 April: .

21st century

 2007 - 1 November: Murder of Meredith Kercher.
 2008 - MiniMetro automated people mover system begins operating.
 2011 - Perugia San Francesco d'Assisi – Umbria International Airport terminal built.
 2013 - Population: 162,986.
 2014 -  held; Andrea Romizi becomes mayor.

See also
 
 Perusia, city of ancient Etruria
 List of mayors of Perugia
 List of bishops of Perugia
  (state archives)
 Umbria history (it)

Other cities in the macroregion of Central Italy:(it)
 Timeline of Ancona, Marche region
 Timeline of Arezzo, Tuscany region
 Timeline of Florence, Tuscany
 Timeline of Livorno, Tuscany
 Timeline of Lucca, Tuscany
 Timeline of Pisa, Tuscany
 Timeline of Pistoia, Tuscany
 Timeline of Prato, Tuscany
 Timeline of Rome, Lazio region
 Timeline of Siena, Tuscany

References

This article incorporates information from the Italian Wikipedia.

Bibliography

in English

in Italian

 
 
 
 
 
  1875-1879. 2 volumes: (1) to 1495, (2) 1495-1860.
 
  1887-1892 (4 vols.)

External links

 Items related to Perugia, various dates (via Europeana)
 Items related to Perugia, various dates (via Digital Public Library of America)

Perugia
Perugia
perugia